Wings of the Wild Tour is the fourth Australian concert tour by singer-songwriter Delta Goodrem, in support of her fifth studio album, Wings of the Wild. The tour commenced at Newcastle on 27 October 2016 and concluded at Brisbane on 11 November 2016, and became the highest-selling tour for an Australian artist in 2016.

Background
Goodrem announced her tour during a live show of The Voice Australia on 19 June 2016, before announcing full details on her social media networks. On 25 July 2016, due to popular ticket sales, an additional show was added at the AIS Arena in Canberra.

Tour dates

Setlist

 "Feline" (contains excerpts of "Child of the Universe")
 "Innocent Eyes"
 "In This Life"
 "Sitting on Top of the World"
 "Dear Life"
 "Touch"
 "Not Me, Not I"
 "Mistaken Identity" (contains excerpts of "Cornflake Girl")
 "Heavy"
 "Brave Face"
 "Wish You Were Here"
 "Lost Without You"
 "Memory" (from the musical Cats)
 "In the Name of Love" / "Love Thy Will Be Done"
 "Will You Fall For Me" / "Don't Let Go (Love)"
 "Almost Here"
 "Encore" (at select dates) 
 "Just Call"
 "The River"
 "Out of the Blue" / "Hey Jude"
 "I Believe in a Thing Called Love"
 "Enough" / "I'm Not Giving Up" (excerpt)
 "Heart Hypnotic" / "Never Forget You"
 "Predictable"
 "Believe Again"
 "Born to Try"
 "Wings"

Live recordings
A live recording of the tour was released on DVD and Blu-ray on 2 November 2018.

Credits
Artist/Executive Producer: Delta Goodrem
Creative Directors: The Squared Division - Ashley Evans & Antony Ginandjar
Backstage Coordinator/Artist Wardrobe: Lea Goodrem
Assistant to Delta Goodrem: Dylan Browne
Hair/Makeup Stylist: Michael Brennan
MD/Keys/Vocals: Darryl Beaton
MD/Strings/Guitar/Vocals: Vince Pizzinga
Drums/Vocals: Sabath (Buddy) Siolo
Bass/Vocals: Adam Ventoura
Backing Vocals: Sharon Muscat & Christine Muscat
Production Manager/FOH Engineer: George Gorga
Monitor Engineer: Kellie McKee
Systems Engineer: Dean Marquis
RF Tech: Ben Northmore
Lighting Director: Hugh Taranto
Lighting Tech: Jonathan Streckfuss, Timother Allder & Michael O'Connor
Stage Tech: Randall Casey & Darren Brain
Video Director/Content Director: Rachel Johnston
Video Camera Operator: Katrina Harding
TDC LED Tech: Jason Cowlrick
TEG Promoter Representative: Paul Drennan
TEG Production Manager: Howard Freeman
TEG Tour Manager: Lee Freeman
Digital Coordinator: Marla Altschuler
Photographer: Joseph Dadic

References

Delta Goodrem concert tours
2016 concert tours
2016 in Australian music